
Changcheng is the pinyin romanization of various Mandarin Chinese names.

It may refer to:

"Great Wall", fortifications in China
 The Great Wall of China ("The Long Wall")
 Ming Great Wall
 Great Wall of Qi in Shandong
 Miaojiang Great Wall in western Hunan
 Cheolli Jangseong in northeast China
 Underground Great Wall of China
 Great Firewall

Administrative divisions of China
 Changcheng District, a district of Jiayuguan, Gansu

Towns
 Changcheng, Shaanxi (长城), a town in Wuqi County, Shaanxi
 Changcheng, Lanling County (长城), a town in Lanling County, Shandong
 Changcheng, Zhucheng (昌城), a town in Zhucheng, Shandong

Townships
Changcheng Township, Gansu (长城乡), in Wuwei, Gansu
Changcheng Township, Hunan (长城乡), in Xiangtan, Hunan
Changcheng Township, Shanxi (长城乡), in Yanggao County, Shanxi

Subdistricts
Changcheng Subdistrict, Dalian (长城街道), in Lüshunkou District, Dalian, Liaoning
Changcheng Subdistrict, Shizuishan (长城街道), in Dawukou District, Shizuishan, Ningxia
Changcheng Subdistrict, Jiangyou (长城街道), in Jiangyou, Sichuan

Film
The Great Wall (film), a 2016 Chinese film by Zhang Yimou
Great Wall Film Company, a 1920s Chinese film company based in Shanghai
Great Wall Movie Enterprises (1949–1982), a Chinese film company based in Hong Kong

Others
Great Wall Motors, a Chinese automobile manufacturer
Great Wall Wine, a Chinese wine company
Great Wall Station (Antarctica), a Chinese research station in Antarctica 
Great Wall Airlines, a defunct Chinese airline
Great Wall Pan Asia Holdings, a Hong Kong property investment company
Beijing Great Wall, a Chinese women's basketball team

See also
 History of the Great Wall of China
 Great Wall (disambiguation)
 Chancheng District, a district of Foshan, Guangdong, China
 Changsong County, a county on the Chinese border in North Phyŏngan, North Korea, known in Chinese history as Changcheng
 Changcheng, Hainan (昌城), formerly Changhua
 Changchengopterus, an extinct pterosaur genus
 Changchengornis, an extinct bird genus